Usha Meena (born 1 July 1949) is an Indian politician and a Member of Parliament elected from the Sawai Madhopur constituency in the Indian state of Rajasthan being an Indian National Congress candidate.

Early life
She was born on 1 July 1949 in the Alwar, Rajasthan. She is the daughter of Late Captain Chhuttan Lal Meena (Ex-Member of Parliament, Congress). She married Dharam Singh Meena (IAS) and has two sons and a daughter.

Career
Usha completed her Bachelor of Artsfrom University of Rajasthan, Jaipur. 
She was first elected to the 11th Lok Sabha in 1996. Till 1997, she was 
 Member, Committee on Industry
 Member, Consultative Committee, Ministry of Water Resources
In 1998, she was re-elected to the 12th Lok Sabha and served as 
 Member, Committee on Agriculture
 Member, Consultative committee, Ministry of Water Resources
She has also been a member of Hindi Shiksha Samiti during 1998–99.

References

India MPs 1998–1999
Women in Rajasthan politics
Articles created or expanded during Women's History Month (India) - 2014
People from Alwar
1949 births
Living people
20th-century Indian women politicians
20th-century Indian politicians
Indian National Congress politicians from Rajasthan
India MPs 1996–1997
Lok Sabha members from Rajasthan
People from Sawai Madhopur district